Southmall Manurewa is a shopping centre located in Manurewa, a suburb of Auckland, New Zealand, located  south of the Auckland CBD.

History and development
The centre was opened in November 1967 and developed by London based Hammerson Propery & Investment Trust. It was Aucklands third major mall after LynnMall and Pakuranga Town Centre. During 1987, the centre was extensively remodeled and was redesigned from an open air to an enclosed centre.

In 2016, Southmall Manurewa was nominated as one of the 'saddest' malls in New Zealand, citing a lack of development, an "uninviting and dangerous" vibe and Westfield Manukau City in the nearby vicinity attracting more appeal from shoppers.

See also
 List of shopping centres in New Zealand

References

Buildings and structures in Auckland
Shopping centres in the Auckland Region
Shopping malls established in 1967
1960s architecture in New Zealand